"Old Cases" is the fourth episode of the first season of the HBO original series The Wire. The episode was written by David Simon from a story by David Simon and Ed Burns and was directed by Clement Virgo. It originally aired on June 23, 2002.

Plot summary

The Police 
Greggs and McNulty attend a court hearing for Marvin Browning, a Barksdale dealer arrested for a hand-to-hand deal. Hoping he will give them information, they push Assistant State's Attorney Dawkins to pursue a maximum sentence, even though Browning had only been caught selling small amounts of heroin and cocaine. He nonetheless summarily refuses their offer of a deal. Polk visits Mahon in the hospital, where he learns that Mahon will be getting an early retirement and an increase in his pension due to his injury. Meanwhile, Herc and Carver drive to a juvenile detention center in Prince George's County, only to find that Bodie has escaped from the low-security facility. They raid Bodie's home but find only his grandmother. Embarrassed by the rude intrusion, Herc apologizes and leaves his card.

Bunk and McNulty review old homicide cases and try to match them to the Barksdale Organization. Landsman insists they review the case of Deirdre Kresson, a college girl murdered far from the west side, with a "Dee" listed as a possible suspect. McNulty reluctantly agrees to investigate the seemingly unrelated murder since Homicide is currently understaffed. At the crime scene, the two communicate using only variations of the word "fuck" as they recreate the murder and find a shell casing and bullet that previous detectives missed. Landsman visits Rawls and, while noting McNulty's character flaws, asserts that those very qualities make him a good detective. Relenting, Rawls offers a deal: if McNulty wraps up the detail in two weeks, he can return to normal duty.

Greggs and Bubbles discuss the recent hit on the Barksdale stash. He is disappointed she has never heard of Omar or his brother, No-Heart Anthony. McNulty is forced to drive Bubbles to his son's soccer game. During the trip, he discusses sharing parental custody with his estranged wife Elena, but the conversation devolves into profanity. At home, Greggs notices Cheryl's cell phone bill and realizes that the Barksdale dealers use pagers to avoid any documentation of incoming and outgoing calls. Phelan is disappointed when Burrell tells him they have nothing on the Barksdales and phones McNulty. Daniels meets with Burrell and tells him that he can take the Barksdale case wherever the deputy commissioner wants, raising the possibility of McNulty's suggested wire to make the case.

Greggs suggests pager cloning to monitor Barksdale communications, but Daniels points out that they need to have a number to bug. Freamon surprises everybody by revealing that the number he found in the stash house belongs to D'Angelo. While sharing a drink with McNulty, Freamon explains that he was transferred to the pawn shop unit after pursuing a politically-connected suspect against his major's orders. Freamon warns that McNulty is likely on a similar path. That night, McNulty shows up at Greggs' apartment drunk. She confirms that their visual surveillance was unable to follow targets into the towers as planned. Back with Cheryl, Greggs explains that McNulty is lonely, and they begin to make love.

The Street 
Omar, Brandon, and Bailey enjoy the proceeds from the Barksdale robbery. Brandon apologizes for using Omar's name during the raid, but Omar points out that he was already well known in Baltimore anyway. He is worried that the Barksdales could attack Brandon, now revealed to be Omar's lover. An addict approaches Omar with her infant son and respectfully asks for a free fix, which he gives her.

Meanwhile, Avon discusses the loss of the stash with his enforcers Anton "Stinkum" Artis and Wee-Bey and puts a contract out on Omar's crew. Avon doubles the bounty when informed by Stinkum that Omar is gay. Stringer tells Avon he is worried about the pit operation since the robbery coincided with the police raid. He reassures Avon that his nephew D'Angelo is doing well, but he is worried there may be a leak from someone else in D'Angelo's crew. Bodie arrives back at the pit, where Poot and Wallace are surprised that he got home so soon after his arrest. D'Angelo bristles when Bodie says he would still be there had it been him, and tells them that he murdered Kresson, Avon's scorned girlfriend, after she had threatened revenge by testifying to the police. Bodie, who has never killed anybody, is humbled. The dealers destroy some new security cameras around the towers.

Production

Title reference 
The title refers to both the old homicide cases being investigated by Bunk and McNulty and to the old bullet cases found at the Deirdre Kresson crime scene.

Epigraph 

The line is said as Bubbles is being returned to the ghetto by McNulty after the two have spent an afternoon in suburbia, which Bubbles refers to as "Leave It to Beaver land." Bubbles is referring to the fact that despite the short drive, there is a night and day difference between Baltimore county (heaven) and Baltimore City (here).

Music 
When Freamon and McNulty start talking in the bar, Miles Davis' "All Blues", from the album Kind of Blue plays diegetically in the background.  When the head has finished and Davis begins his trumpet solo, Freamon opens up and tells McNulty what happened to his career.

Credits

Starring cast 
Although credited, Deirdre Lovejoy does not appear in this episode.

Guest stars

First appearances 
This episode marks the first appearance of Jimmy McNulty's estranged family. Callie Thorne plays Elena McNulty, Jimmy's estranged wife and the mother of his two sons. Callie Thorne also appeared on Homicide: Life on the Street alongside several other Wire cast members. Antonio Cordova plays Michael McNulty, Jimmy's soccer-playing younger son. His older son, Sean, remains unseen in this episode.

Reception 
This episode was noted for the "Fuck scene" in which Bunk and McNulty evaluate a crime scene while repeatedly saying only variations of the word "fuck". TimeOut listed it as one of the Top 5 scenes from the series.

References

External links 
 "Old Cases" at HBO.com
 

The Wire (season 1) episodes
2002 American television episodes
Television episodes written by David Simon